Nashville Underground is the second studio album by Jerry Reed, also the second Reed recorded for RCA.

Critical reception

Stephen Thomas Erlewine of AllMusic described the album as "highly polished, exquisitely produced country-pop" and "a thoroughly engaging piece of period pop".

Track listing 
All tracks are written by Jerry Reed, except where noted.

 "Remembering" – 2:52
 "A Thing Called Love" – 2:23
 "You Wouldn't Know a Good Thing" – 2:48
 "Save Your Dreams" – 1:58
 "Almost Crazy" – 2:44
 "You've Been Crying Again" – 2:10
 "Fine on My Mind" – 2:42
 "Tupelo Mississippi Flash" – 2:48
 "Wabash Cannonball" (credited to J.A. Roff) – 2:33
 "Hallelujah I Love Her So" (Ray Charles) – 2:53
 "John Henry" – 2:22

Charts

References 

1968 albums
Jerry Reed albums